The David Coles AM Stakes, registered as the National Stakes is a South Australian Jockey Club Group 3  Thoroughbred horse race for horses aged two years old, at set weights with penalties, over a distance of 1200 metres, held annually at Morphettville Racecourse in Adelaide, Australia during the Autumn Carnival.

History

Name
1985–1993 - National Stakes
1994–1998 - SGIC Stakes
 1999 - Stillwell Stakes
 2000 - National Stakes
2001–2012  - The Jansz
 2013–2020 - National Stakes
 2021 onwards - David Coles AM Stakes

Grade
1985–1986 - Listed Race
1987 onwards - Group 3

Records

The race record time for running of the 1200 metres is held by Triple Asset in a time of 1:10.11 in 2011.

Most wins by a trainer - 3 times: 
Colin S. Hayes - 1987, 1989, 1990
Leon Macdonald - 1996, 2009, 2012

Winners

 2022 - Maximillius
 2021 - Heresy
 2020 - Extra Time
 2019 - Li'l Kontra
 2018 - Marcel From Madrid
 2017 - I'll Have A Bit
 2016 - I Am A Star
 2015 - Prince Of Brooklyn
 2014 - Moonovermanhattan
 2013 - Vivi Veloce
 2012 - Dinkum Diamond
 2011 - Triple Asset
 2010 - Toorak Toff
 2009 - Majestic Music
 2008 - Viennese
 2007 - Gabbidon
 2006 - Lectrice
 2005 - Tonz More Fun
 2004 - General’s Dynasty
 2003 - Great Is Great
 2002 - Rohatyn
 2001 - Cable
 2000 - Super Elegant
 1999 - Spargo
 1998 - Gold Crystal
 1997 - La Baraka
 1996 - Will Fly
 1995 - Embargo
 1994 - Linbird
 1993 - Harkaway
 1992 - Mookta
 1991 - Jakpil
 1990 - Sushi Rocket
 1989 - Dancer’s Choice
 1988 - Pride Of Ingenue
 1987 - Kaapstad
 1986 - Bataan
 1985 - Seiger

See also
 List of Australian Group races
 Group races

References

Horse races in Australia
Flat horse races for two-year-olds